Noah Vinko Botic (born 11 January 2002) is an Australian soccer player who plays as a forward for Western United.

Club career

Early career
Botic was born in Sydney, Australia, and played for numerous different clubs in Australia at youth level.

Hoffenheim
Following trials with English sides Manchester United, as well as interest from Everton and German champions Bayern Munich, Botic signed a two-year scholarship deal with Hoffenheim in 2019.

In October 2019, he was named among the 60 best young talents in the world by English newspaper The Guardian.

Due to his potential, Botic has been tipped to be Australia's successor to clinical striker Mark Viduka, who captained Australia to their best finish at a World Cup, as well as being the top-scoring Australian in the UEFA Champions League.

Western United
On 1 August 2021, Botic returned to Australia to sign for Western United.

International career
Botic has represented Australia at under-16 and under-17 level. He was joint-top scorer at the 2018 AFC U-16 Championship with five goals from five games, as Australia went out to Japan at the semi-final stage. He followed this up with four goals in four games at the 2019 FIFA U-17 World Cup in Brazil. He also scored in a friendly against England under-17s.

For his performances at youth level, Botic received the inaugural Dylan Tombides medal, awarded to the best Australian soccer player from under-17 to under-23 level, in 2019.

Personal life
Botic is the cousin of Australian international soccer player Tomi Juric and his brother, Deni.

Career statistics

Club

Notes

References

2002 births
Living people
Soccer players from Sydney
Australian soccer players
Australia youth international soccer players
Croatian footballers
Australian people of Croatian descent
Association football forwards
A-League Men players
St George FC players
Western Sydney Wanderers FC players
Sydney Olympic FC players
Rockdale Ilinden FC players
TSG 1899 Hoffenheim players
Western United FC players
Australian expatriate soccer players
Australian expatriate sportspeople in Germany
Expatriate footballers in Germany